Wee Lady Betty is a 1917 American silent drama film produced and distributed by the Triangle Film Corporation. It was directed by Charles Miller and stars Bessie Love, Frank Borzage, and Charles K. French. It is considered lost.

Plot

O'Reilly Castle, set on a small Irish isle, has been occupied by the family of Wee Lady Betty (Love) for generations. However, when the actual owner of the castle dies, the ownership is transferred to his heir, Roger O'Reilly (Borzage). In an attempt to scare away the new owner, Betty briefly tricks him into thinking that the castle is haunted, but he falls in love with her.

Cast

Production 
Village scenes were filmed on the lot of Triangle Studio in Culver City, California. The village set had previously been used for the Bessie Barriscale film Wooden Shoes (1917) and In Slumberland (1917).

References

External links 

 
 
 

1917 drama films
1917 films
1917 lost films
American black-and-white films
Silent American drama films
American silent feature films
Films set in Ireland
Lost American films
Lost drama films
Triangle Film Corporation films
Films directed by Charles Miller
1910s American films